The women's 100 metres at the 2015 World Championships in Athletics was held at the Beijing National Stadium on 23 and 24 August. Shelly-Ann Fraser-Pryce entered the competition as the defending champion and the world leading athlete that season with a time of 10.74 seconds.

Summary
The semi-finals eliminated the second fastest woman in 2015, English Gardner, otherwise it was mostly the expected fastest athletes from the world list.  The surprise was Dafne Schippers improving her own national record by almost a tenth of a second to 10.83 while winning the third semi-final.  Previous to that, Schippers had one significant win in London at the end of July, a race that only included one other finalist, Blessing Okagbare, and had been soundly defeated by Fraser-Pryce, Gardner and Okagbare in Paris in early June.  Schippers time won her a center lane position, towering next to Fraser-Pryce in the final.

In the final, the gun went off and as expected Fraser-Pryce, the "pocket rocket" was out in front, her first three steps clearly faster than the field.  While Schippers had the second best reaction time of the field, she appeared to be slightly behind Natasha Morrison and Michelle-Lee Ahye with veteran Veronica Campbell-Brown out in second place behind her teammate.  But as top end speed was reached, Schippers and Tori Bowie behind her began eating into the lead with every stride.	
She was unable to catch Fraser-Pryce who held her arms up in victory as she crossed the line, running out of time Schippers made a desperate early lean at the finish while Bowie over strided her last few steps also in desperation in third.	
Each of the first 5 were clearly separated by .05 of a second.  Schippers 10.81 in second place improved upon her national record for the second time in the same day.

Records
Prior to the competition, the records were as follows:

Qualification standards

Schedule

Results

Heats
Qualification: Best 3 (Q) and next 3 fastest (q) qualify for the next round.

Wind:
Heat 1: +0.5 m/s, Heat 2: -1.3 m/s, Heat 3: -1.2 m/s  Heat 4: +2.3 m/s, Heat 5: -1.6 m/s, Heat 6: +1.5 m/s, Heat 7: -0.5 m/s

Semifinals
Qualification: Best 2 (Q) and next 2 fastest (q) qualify for the next round.

Wind:
Heat 1: +0.5 m/s, Heat 2: +0.9 m/s, Heat 3: -0.2 m/s

Final
The final was started at 21:35.
Wind: -0.3 m/s

References

100
100 metres at the World Athletics Championships
2015 in women's athletics